Milledgeville may refer to:

Places in the United States
Milledgeville, Georgia
Milledgeville, Illinois
Milledgeville, Indiana
Milledgeville, Ohio
Milledgeville, Tennessee

Other uses
USS Milledgeville, the name of three ships in the United States Navy
Central State Hospital (Milledgeville, Georgia), a mental health facility in Milledgeville, Georgia